Pyrroline-5-carboxylate reductase 1, mitochondrial is an enzyme that in humans is encoded by the PYCR1 gene.

This gene encodes an enzyme that catalyzes the NAD(P)H-dependent conversion of pyrroline-5-carboxylate to proline. This enzyme may also play a physiologic role in the generation of NADP(+) in some cell types. The protein forms a homopolymer and localizes to the mitochondrion. Alternate splicing results in two transcript variants encoding different isoforms. As reported by Bruno Reversade and colleagues, PYCR1 deficiency in humans causes a progeroid disease known as De Barsy Syndrome mainly affecting connective tissues with dermis thinning and bone fragility.

References

Further reading

External links 
 PDBe-KB provides an overview of all the structure information available in the PDB for Human Pyrroline-5-carboxylate reductase 1, mitochondrial (PYCR1)